The Queen's Artillery Regiment was a Royal Danish Army artillery regiment.

History
The Queen's Artillery Regiment was created on 1 November 2000 by merging Southern Jutland Artillery Regiment in Varde and North Jutland Artillery Regiment located in Skive. It was located on Varde Barracks. On 1 November 2005 King's Artillery Regiment was merged with the regiment, creating the artillery regiment, the Danish Artillery Regiment, the last artillery regiment of Denmark's armed forces.

Units

  3rd Armoured Artillery Battalion (2000-2004)
  7th Armoured Artillery Battalion (2000-2004)
  8th Artillery Battalion (2000-2004)
  14th Anti Air Artillery Battalion (2000-2004)
  18th MLRS Battery (2000-2004)
  23rd Artillery Battalion (2000-2004)
  24th Artillery Battalion (2000-2004)
  Anti Air Artillery Battery/Danish International Brigade
  Staff and Target Acquisition Battery/Danish Division (2000-2004)

Artillery regiments of Denmark